Siderotype is  an iron-based photographic print. The term was coined by Sir John Frederick William Herschel. A short list of processes defined as siderotypes is as follows: amphitype, argentotype, argyrotype, aurotype, breath print, Brown Line, chromatic photo, chrysotype, cyanotype, ferrogallic process, kallitype, kelaenotype, Nakahara's Process, palladiotype, Pellet print, Phipson's process, platinotype, printout platinum, satista print, sepia platinotype, sepiatype and vandyke.

References

External links
 http://www.siderotype.com

Photographic processes dating from the 19th century